A. Johnkumar is an Indian businessman and Member of Legislative Assembly from Nellithope, Puducherry.

Political career 
Johnkumar represented the Nellithope constituency of Puducherry and is a member of the Indian National Congress party. In 2016 Puducherry Legislative Assembly election, he defeated Om Sakthi Sekar of AIADMK in Nellithope by a huge margin. He was appointed the Parliamentary Secretary to the Puducherry Chief Minister. Followed by his resignation on his constituency in the legislative Assembly to enable Chief Minister V. Narayanasamy to contest a by-election before the deadline and become a member of the territorial assembly, he was appointed Special Representative of Puducherry administration in New Delhi in January 2017.

In 2019, JohnKumar contested and won the assembly by-election from Kamaraj Nagar constituency as a Congress candidate in Puducherry by a huge margin.

Joining BJP 
On February 16, 2021, he left the Congress and later joined BJP. Earlier in December 2021, Chief of Pradesh Congress Committee A.V. Subramanian said that A. John Kumar was trying to switch sides to BJP due to the “fear of getting raided by the Income Tax Department.”

Supporters of John Kumar, representing Kamaraj Nagar constituency, staged a protest and sat in dharna in June 2021 in front of the BJP office demanding a ministerial seat for him in the AINRC-led NDA government. The BJP members pulled down the flex erected and tore the banners in the BJP office.

Income tax raids 
Income tax officials found nearly 1.6 crore during a search of A. John Kumar's house at Nellithope in September 2016 just two days after he vacated his constituency for Chief Minister V. Narayanasamy to contest a by-election. At a press meet John Kumar said that as he had sold a piece of land a few days ago, he did not have any documents with him. The officials asked me to submit the documents to get the money back”. He had paid income tax accordingly and there was no tax evasion.

The Income Tax Office in Chennai conducted a search on November 2016 at the residence of A. John Kumar. I-T-T personnel reached his residence at Savaripadayachi Street in the Nellithope constituency around 7 a.m. and searched the house till around 4 p.m. Terming the move politically motivated, John Kumar told mediapersons “The raid was meant to disrupt the campaign of the Chief Minister." John Kumar disclosed the IT dept. seized Rs.14 lakh.

Legal cases 
A chargesheet was filed against A. John Kumar in a local court by Assistant Public Prosecutor for alleged suppression of information terming the move politically motivated, Mr. John Kumar told mediapersons. “The raid was meant to disrupt the campaign of the Chief Minister. I was asked not to leave the house”, on about his property in his affidavit when he contested the 2019 by-election from Kamaraj Nagar constituency and later won it.
An FIR was registered earlier on the directions of Chief Judicial Magistrate in 2020 a complaint which alleged that John Kumar had not shown a property of more than two hectare land he purchased at Thirukkanur in his affidavit in 2019. This is because no FIR was filed by the police station on the same complaint in 2019.

References

External links

A. Johnkumar(Indian National Congress(INC)): Constituency- NELLITHOPE(PUDUCHERRY) – Affidavit Information of Candidate:
A.JOHNKUMAR MLA of NELLITHOPE Puducherry contact address & email
John Kumar assumes office as a special representative

Lok Sabha members from Puducherry
Indian National Congress politicians from Puducherry
Living people
People from Pondicherry
Puducherry politicians
1965 births
Puducherry MLAs 2016–2021
Bharatiya Janata Party politicians from Puducherry
Puducherry MLAs 2021–2026